Jalan Segambut is a major road in Kuala Lumpur, Malaysia. It is being expanded from a two-lane to a four-lane road leading to Segambut Dalam and Mont Kiara. The project was expected to complete in January 2013. Property prices along this road have increased because of this project.

List of junctions

Roads in Kuala Lumpur